Independence Path is a left-wing political party operating in the Turkish Republic of Northern Cyprus. The formation, which previously operated as a non-governmental organization, became a party in 2018. Participated in the 2022 parliamentary election for the first time.

References 

Political parties in Northern Cyprus
Political parties established in 2018
Socialist parties in Cyprus